The 2020 WNBL season was the 41st season of the competition since its establishment in 1981. The Canberra Capitals were the two-time defending champions, but were defeated in the Semi-Finals by Melbourne. The Southside Flyers won the Grand Final, defeating the Townsville Fire, 99–82. The Flyers took home the franchise's fourth WNBL title overall, this being their first since rebranding as Southside.

Chemist Warehouse was again the WNBL's naming rights partner for this season, after signing a three-year deal in July 2018. Spalding again provided equipment including the official game ball, alongside iAthletic supplying team apparel for the fourth consecutive season.

Due to the COVID-19 pandemic, a North Queensland hub was set to host the season. The season was originally 2020–21 and would be traditionally played over several months across the summer, however this season's scheduling had been condensed. The six-week season saw Townsville, Cairns and Mackay host a 52-game regular season fixture, plus a four game final series (2 x semi-finals, preliminary final and grand final). Each team contested 13 games starting on 11 November, with the grand final scheduled for 20 December.

Player movement

Standings

Finals

Statistics

Individual statistic leaders

Individual game highs

Awards

Player of the Round

Team of the Round

Postseason Awards

Team captains and coaches

References

External links 
 WNBL official website
 WNBL Hub season fixtures

Basketball
2020 in basketball
Australia